Pinca (also pogača, sirnica or pinza) is a traditional Dalmatian, Istrian and Bay of Kotor Easter sweet roll. It is also popular in the Goriška region of Slovenia, the Slovenian Littoral, western Croatia and in parts of the Province of Trieste and Gorizia of Italy.

Description
It is a sweet bread loaf with the sign of a cross, which is carved in with a knife before baking, on the upper side.

Usage
Pinca is eaten to celebrate the end of Lent, because it contains many eggs. Together with Easter eggs, pinca has remained the centrepiece of the family Easter breakfast in areas where it is eaten. In urban areas it is increasingly the only item taken to Easter Mass for blessing, and is often given to guests as a symbol of good wishes.

External links
Pinca on Istrianet.org

Croatian cuisine
Montenegrin cuisine
Slovenian desserts
Croatian desserts
Easter bread
Yeast breads